Yowie is one of several names for an Australian folklore entity that is reputed to live in the Outback. The creature has its roots in Aboriginal oral history. In parts of Queensland, they are known as quinkin (or as a type of quinkin), and as joogabinna, in parts of New South Wales they are called Ghindaring, jurrawarra, myngawin, puttikan, doolaga, gulaga and thoolagal. Other names include yaroma, noocoonah, wawee, pangkarlangu, jimbra and tjangara. Yowie-type creatures are common in Aboriginal Australian legends, particularly in the eastern Australian states.

Description

The yowie's feet are described as much larger than a human's, but alleged yowie tracks are inconsistent in shape and toe number, and the descriptions of yowie foot and footprints provided by yowie witnesses are even more varied than those of Bigfoot. The yowie's nose is described as wide and flat.

Behaviourally, some report the yowie as timid or shy. Others describe the yowie as sometimes violent or aggressive.

Origins of the term
The origin of the name "yowie" to describe unidentified Australian hominids is unclear. The term was in use in 1875 among the Kámilarói people and documented in Rev. William Ridley's "Kámilarói and Other Australian Languages" (page 138) 

“Yō-wī” is a spirit that roams over the earth at night.

Some modern writers suggested that it arose through Aboriginal legends of the "Yahoo". Robert Holden recounts several stories that support this from the nineteenth century, including this European account from 1842:

Another story about the name, collected from an Aboriginal source, suggests that the creature is a part of the Dreamtime.

On the other hand, Jonathan Swift's yahoos from Gulliver's Travels, and European traditions of hairy wild men, are also cited as a possible source. Furthermore, great public excitement was aroused in Britain in the early 1800s with the first arrivals of captive orangutan for display.

History of sightings
In a 1987 column in The Sydney Morning Herald columnist Margaret Jones wrote that the first Australian yowie sighting was said to have taken place as early as 1795.

19th century
In the 1850s, accounts of "Indigenous Apes" appeared in the Australian Town and Country Journal. The earliest account in November 1876 asked readers; "Who has not heard, from the earliest settlement of the colony, the blacks speaking of some unearthly animal or inhuman creature ... namely the Yahoo-Devil Devil, or hairy man of the wood ..."

In an article entitled "Australian Apes" appearing six years later, amateur naturalist Henry James McCooey claimed to have seen an "indigenous ape" on the south coast of New South Wales, between Batemans Bay and Ulladulla:

McCooey offered to capture an ape for the Australian Museum for £40. According to Robert Holden, a second outbreak of reported ape sightings appeared in 1912. The yowie appeared in Donald Friend's Hillendiana, a collection of writings about the goldfields near Hill End in New South Wales. Friend refers to the yowie as a species of bunyip. Holden also cites the appearance of the yowie in a number of Australian tall stories in the late nineteenth and early twentieth centuries.

Present day
According to "Top End Yowie investigator" Andrew McGinn, the death and mutilation of a pet dog near Darwin could have been the result of an attack by the mythological Yowie. The dog's owners believed dingoes were responsible.

Australian Capital Territory
In 2010, a Canberra man said he saw an animal described as "a juvenile covered in hair, with long arms that almost touched the ground" in his garage. A friend later told him it could be a yowie.

New South Wales
Accounts of yowie-sightings in New South Wales include:
 In 1977, The Sydney Morning Herald reported that residents on Oxley Island near Taree recently heard screaming noises made by an animal at night, and that cryptozoologist Rex Gilroy would soon arrive to search for the mythological yowie.
 In 1994, Tim the Yowie Man claimed to have seen a yowie in the Brindabella Ranges.
 In 1996, while on a driving holiday, a couple from Newcastle claim to have seen a yowie between Braidwood and the coast. They said it was a shaggy creature, walking upright, standing at a height of at least 2.1 metres tall, with disproportionately long arms and no neck.
 In August 2000, a Canberra bushwalker described seeing an unknown bipedal beast in the Brindabella Mountains. The bushwalker, Steve Piper, caught the incident on videotape. That film is known as the 'Piper Film'.
 In March 2011, a witness reported to NSW National Parks and Wildlife Service seeing a yowie in the Blue Mountains at Springwood, west of Sydney. The witness had filmed the creature, and taken photographs of its footprints.
 In May 2012, an American television crew claimed it had recorded audio of a yowie in a remote region on the NSW–Queensland border.
 In June 2013, a Lismore resident and music videographer claimed to have seen a yowie just north of Bexhill.

In the mid-1970s, the Queanbeyan Festival Board and 2CA together offered a AU$200,000 reward to anyone who could capture and present a yowie: the reward is yet to be claimed.

Northern Territory
In the late 1990s, there were several reports of yowie sightings in the area around Acacia Hills. One such sighting was by mango farmer Katrina Tucker who reported in 1997 having been just metres away from a hairy humanoid creature on her property. Photographs of the footprint were collected at the time.

Queensland
The Springbrook region in south-east Queensland has had more yowie reports than anywhere else in Australia. In 1977, former Queensland Senator Bill O'Chee reported to the Gold Coast Bulletin he had seen a yowie while on a school trip in Springbrook. O'Chee compared the creature he saw to the character Chewbacca from Star Wars. He told reporters that the creature he saw had been over three metres tall.

A persistent story is that of the Mulgowie Yowie, which was last reported as having been seen in 2001.

In March 2014, two yowie searchers claimed to have filmed the yowie in South Queensland using an infrared tree camera, collected fur samples, and found large footprints. Later that year, a Gympie man told media he had encountered yowies on several occasions, including conversing with, and teaching some English to, a very large male yowie in the bush north-east of Gympie, and several people in Port Douglas claimed to have seen yowies, near Mowbray and at the Rocky Point range.

Prominent yowie hunters
 Rex Gilroy. Since the mid-1970s, paranormal enthusiast Rex Gilroy, a self-employed cryptozoologist, has attempted to popularise the yowie. Gilroy claims to have collected over 3,000 reports of them and proposed that they comprise a relict population of extinct ape or Homo species. Rex Gilroy believes that the yowie is related to the North American Bigfoot. Along with his partner Heather Gilroy, Gilroy has spent fifty years amassing his yowie collection.
 Tim the Yowie Man. A published author who claims to have seen a yowie in the Brindabella Ranges in 1994. Since then, Tim the Yowie Man has investigated yowie sightings and other paranormal phenomena. He also writes a regular column in Australian newspapers The Canberra Times and The Sydney Morning Herald. In 2004, Tim the Yowie Man won a legal case against Cadbury, a popular British confectionery company. Cadbury had claimed that his moniker was too similar to their range of Yowie confectionery.
 Gary Opit, ABC Local Radio wildlife programmer and environmental scientist.

Rejection of the yowie in favour of the yahoo
Australian historian Graham Joyner maintains the yowie has never existed. He points out that it was unknown before 1975 and that it originated in a misunderstanding.

Joyner's interest has been in the nineteenth century phenomenon known as the yahoo (also called the hairy man, Australian ape or Australian gorilla), a shadowy creature then seen as an undiscovered marsupial but one that was presumably extinct by the early twentieth century. There is some evidence for its former existence (Joyner 2008, p. 109). His 1977 book The Hairy Man of South Eastern Australia is a collection of documents about the yahoo. It was based on research begun in 1970 and summarised in a paper dated July 1973 ('Notes on the hairy man, wild man or yahoo', National Library of Australia MS 3889), at which time the yahoo had long been forgotten and nothing had been heard of the alleged yowie. He has since explained that the book was published to promote the former and to counter, not to endorse, the then new and extraordinary claims about the latter (Joyner 2008, p. 10).

According to Joyner, the notion of the yowie arose following a review in a Sydney newspaper of John Napier's 1972 book Bigfoot: The Yeti and Sasquatch in Myth and Reality, Jonathan Cape, London. In response the cryptozoologist and ufologist Rex Gilroy, citing an Aboriginal figure from western and central Australia called the Tjangara, made the astonishing claim that Australia was home to its own Abominable Snowman. However, the image of the enormous primate that Gilroy eventually presented to the Australian public in May 1975 as the yowie, while overtly modelled on exotic forms like the yeti, was apparently inspired by muddled recollections from the newspaper's readers of much earlier stories about the yahoo (Joyner 2008, pp. 5–8). On this estimation only the yahoo has (or more accurately had) a basis in reality.

In popular culture
Terror Australis: Call of Cthulhu in the Land Down Under, first published in 1987 as a supplement to the role-playing game Call of Cthulhu, includes the yowie as one of several mythical monsters of Australia.
Season eight of the soap opera A Country Practice (1988) features a suspected yowie sighting.
From 1994-98, the original vocalist of Christian death metal band Metanoia was named Justin "Yowie" Smith.
English-born writer Geoffry Morgan Pike devised the name and fictitious background for the Yowie brand of chocolates, launched in 1995.
An experimental rock band by the name of Yowie formed in St. Louis, Missouri in the year 2000. A yowie is depicted on the cover art of their debut album Cryptooology.
In the 2001 video game Final Fantasy X, the Yowie appears as a reptilian enemy.
The main monster in the 2003 animated film Scooby-Doo! and the Legend of the Vampire is the Yowie Yahoo, depicted as a vampire living in the Australian desert.
Yowies appear as Australian magical creatures in the 2010 book Fablehaven: Keys to the Demon Prison.
The 2014 action-horror film Throwback centres on the discovery of, and battle with, a yowie.
In season four of the animated series We Bare Bears (2018), the Booby Trapper (voiced by Jemaine Clement) confuses Charlie (voiced by Jason Lee) for a yowie.

See also

 Bunyip, a water-dwelling creature from Australian Aboriginal mythology
 List of monotremes and marsupials of Australia
 Orang Mawas
 Orang Pendek
 Ebu gogo
 Bukit Timah Monkey Man
 Tim the Yowie Man
 Yeti
 Yowie (chocolate), a line of toys based on the yowie
 Yara-ma-yha-who, a creature from Australian Aboriginal mythology
 Dulagal, the Yuin equivalent of the yowie
 Yeren

Notes

References

External links
 
 YOWIE-X© Searching & Tracking the Australian Yowie

Australian Aboriginal legendary creatures
Australian legendary creatures
Hominid cryptids
Legendary mammals
Mythological monsters